MHI may refer to:

 Mitsubishi Heavy Industries, Tokyo, Japan 
 Montreal Heart Institute
 Multi-Handset Interface, US name for Motorola Universal Handy Interface